The Feinstein International Center (FIC) is a research and teaching center based at the Friedman School of Nutrition Science and Policy at Tufts University. The Center promotes the use of evidence and learning in operational and policy responses to protect and strengthen the lives, livelihoods, and dignity of people affected by humanitarian crises.

History and profile 
The center was founded in 1997 as the Feinstein International Famine Center with an endowment from Alan Shawn Feinstein. The Center was originally set up as a tribute to the victims of the Irish famine (1840–1846) on its 150th anniversary. It was established as one of two centers of learning on famine, one at the Friedman School in Boston, US, a city that has a large Irish immigrant population, and one at Cork University in Ireland. In 2006, the Center was renamed the Feinstein International Center (FIC).

Today, FIC has a research and teaching agenda that includes nutrition, food security, livelihoods, refugees, migration, urbanization, pastoralism, humanitarian systems and response, human rights, gender analysis, women's and children's right, protection, war crimes, remedy and reparation. Faculty and staff conduct field-based research with conflict and crises affected populations, local and national leaders, humanitarian and development agencies, government agencies, non-governmental organizations (NGOs), International NGOs, and international organizations.

FIC faculty and staff are based around the world, including in Boston, Massachusetts, New York, New York, London, UK, Ethiopia, Kenya, Sudan, and Uganda.

Research focus and publications 
FIC faculty and researchers work with local and international partners to conduct and share research on a variety of factors in humanitarian contexts. Its current research focuses within the following themes:
 The changing dimensions of poverty and vulnerability
Conflict and its impact on civilians
Food security and famine
Nutrition
People on the move: Migration, displacement, refugees, and urbanization
Promoting evidence based practice in crisis and crisis response
 Resilient Livelihoods

FIC’s publications are regularly made available to humanitarian actors through its own website and distribution network and a variety of partners, including ReliefWeb, a UN website for humanitarian actors.

Teaching at Tufts 
Feinstein faculty teach graduate level courses and advise Masters and Doctoral students primarily at two Tufts University schools:the Friedman School of Nutrition Science and Policy and at the Fletcher School of Law and Diplomacy. Courses are offered on the following areas:
 Field Research Methods
 Forced Migration
 Gender and Culture in Complex Humanitarian Emergencies
 Gender and Human Security in Transitional States and Societies
 Humanitarian Action in Complex Emergencies
 International Humanitarian Response
FIC administers a Master of Arts in Humanitarian Assistance (MAHA) degree that is offered jointly by the Friedman School of Nutrition Science and Policy and the Fletcher School of Law and Diplomacy. The MAHA program is designed for mid-career professionals from government, international, national and private organizations and agencies who expect to continue working in related fields. The recruitment and admissions process seeks to attract a mix of people from different countries, backgrounds, and experiences to create an environment where participants learn from both the classroom experience and from each other. Additionally, FIC provides technical assistance and training globally.

References

External links 
 Feinstein International Center Official Website

Agricultural research
Humanitarian aid
International responses to disasters
Tufts University